Daniel Ryan Magder (born December 12, 1991) is a retired Canadian actor. He has appeared in such projects such as The Famous Jett Jackson, and X-Men. His most prolific role is Edwin Venturi on Life with Derek.

Magder graduated Thornlea Secondary School in Thornhill, Ontario. After attending the University of British Columbia for his first year, he transferred to the Vancouver Film School's writing for film and television course, which he completed in December 2011.  He is a brother of the Alpha Epsilon Pi fraternity, Beta Chi chapter.

Filmography

Television

Film

References

External links

Canadian male film actors
Canadian male child actors
Canadian male television actors
Canadian male voice actors
Living people
Male actors from Toronto
20th-century Canadian male actors
21st-century Canadian male actors
1989 births
University of British Columbia alumni